Reinaldo Nascimento Satorno (born 6 June 2001), simply known as Reinaldo, is a Brazilian footballer who currently plays as a forward for CSA, on loan from Athletico Paranaense.

Career statistics

Club

Honours
Athletico Paranaense
Campeonato Paranaense: 2020

References

External links

Meu Time na Rede profile 

2001 births
Living people
People from Criciúma
Brazilian footballers
Association football forwards
Campeonato Brasileiro Série A players
Campeonato Brasileiro Série B players
Criciúma Esporte Clube players
Club Athletico Paranaense players
Sportspeople from Santa Catarina (state)